José David Rangel Torres (born November 12, 1969) is a Mexican former professional footballer who played as a midfielder.

Career
A defensive midfielder, Rangel began his career with Atletico Potosino and Tampico Madero, joining Cruz Azul in 1990. With his playing time diminishing, he moved to Toluca in 1996 and began a long run of success with the club. The team won the Verano tournaments of 1998, 1999, and 2000, with Rangel starting most matches and providing defensive support for teammates such as José Saturnino Cardozo. He moved to Atlante for the Verano 2002 season, then joined Chiapas before returning to Toluca for his final top-division season in 2005.

Rangel was a member of the Mexican Olympic team that competed at the 1992 Summer Olympics in Barcelona, Spain, playing against Denmark and Australia. He also earned five caps for the full Mexico national team, all of them in 2001 after the appointment of former Toluca coach Enrique Meza. Rangel made his debut on January 24, 2001, in a friendly match against Bulgaria in Morelos, a 0–2 loss. His final call-up came at the 2001 FIFA Confederations Cup, which ended with Mexico suffering first-round elimination after three defeats. The last cap for Rangel came in a 4–0 loss against France on June 3, 2001, at Ulsan Munsu Football Stadium in South Korea.

References

playerhistory

1969 births
Living people
Mexico international footballers
Association football midfielders
Olympic footballers of Mexico
Footballers at the 1992 Summer Olympics
Deportivo Toluca F.C. players
Chiapas F.C. footballers
Liga MX players
Footballers from San Luis Potosí
Cruz Azul footballers
Atlante F.C. footballers
Medalists at the 1991 Pan American Games
Pan American Games silver medalists for Mexico
Pan American Games medalists in football
Footballers at the 1991 Pan American Games
Mexican footballers